The BCF Wolfratshausen is a German association football club from the city of Wolfratshausen, Bavaria.

History
The club was formed in 1957 as BC Farchet, named after a suburb of Wolfratshausen. The club was not a football club as such in its origins but rather its activities took part in the local pub. The term ball in the club names referees to a green ball every club member had to carry as a form of identification. The number of balls was set at 30, making the club quite limited in membership; its current membership sits at 1,400. Failure to produce the ball to another club member on request was a punishable offence. The club was, in those days, what Bavarians referee to as Stöpsel-Club (English: Bottle top club).

The club's lack of football activity was due to not having a home ground at it was decided to play as a reserve team for local side TSV Wolfratshausen to compensate for this. In 1961, the club finally registered with the Bavarian football association and entered competition under its own name. The club's most prominent member in those early days was a young Edmund Stoiber, later to become Minister President of Bavaria. In 1966, the club begun building its own home ground and in 1974, it changed its name to the current BCF Wolfratshausen.

On the field, BCF had to wait considerable time to experience success. In 1995, it came second the local C-Klasse, the lowest possible league a club could play in then in Bavaria, the tenth tier of the Bavarian football league system. After a successful promotion decider, the club moved up a level, to the B-Klasse. In its first season there, it came second but this time failed in the promotion round; a year later it made up for it by winning the league.

The A-Klasse became just another stepping stone for the team, winning the league and earning promotion to the Bezirksliga Oberbayern-Süd. The team came second in this league in its first year there too, but failed in the promotion round, losing in extra time to Wacker Burghausen II. After an average 1999–2000 season, it won its league the year after and moved up to the Bezirksoberliga Oberbayern. In this league, the club proved to good as well, winning it and making it into the tier-five Landesliga Bayern-Süd.

In the Landesliga, BCF looked like repeating the previous seasons, leading the league at the winter break. In spring, it fell somewhat behind and finished the year in fifth place. The next season, 2003–04, it came second in the league after losing a decider to MTV Ingolstadt and had to enter the promotion round. In this game, the team beat SG Quelle Fürth 3–2 and earned promotion to the Oberliga Bayern, Bavarias highest league.

The tier-four Bayernliga provided a mark to high for the club and it finished last in the league, with only six wins out of 34 games, having to return to the Landesliga.

At the end of the 2011–12 season, after a number of seasons in the Landesliga, the club qualified directly for the newly expanded Bayernliga after finishing sixth in the Landesliga. The team struggled against relegation in both the 2012–13 and 2013–14 season, in the later only surviving through victories in the relegation round.

Honours
The club's honours:

League 
 Landesliga Bayern-Süd (V) 
 Runners-up: 2004
 Bezirksoberliga Oberbayern (VI) 
 Champions: 2002
 Bezirksliga Oberbayern-Süd (VII) 
 Champions: 2001
 Runners-up: 1999
 A-Klasse (VII) 
 Champions: 1999
 B-Klasse (IX) 
 Champions: 1998

Recent seasons
The recent season-by-season performance of the club:

With the introduction of the Bezirksoberligas in 1988 as the new fifth tier, below the Landesligas, all leagues below dropped one tier. With the introduction of the Regionalligas in 1994 and the 3. Liga in 2008 as the new third tier, below the 2. Bundesliga, all leagues below dropped one tier. With the establishment of the Regionalliga Bayern as the new fourth tier in Bavaria in 2012 the Bayernliga was split into a northern and a southern division, the number of Landesligas expanded from three to five and the Bezirksoberligas abolished. All leagues from the Bezirksligas onward were elevated one tier.

References

External links 
 Official team site
 BCF Wolfratshausen profile at Weltfussball.de
 Das deutsche Fußball-Archiv historical German domestic league tables 

Football clubs in Germany
Football clubs in Bavaria
Association football clubs established in 1957
Football in Upper Bavaria
1957 establishments in West Germany